A copperplate script is a style of calligraphic writing most commonly associated with English Roundhand. Although often used as an umbrella term for various forms of pointed pen calligraphy, Copperplate most accurately refers to script styles represented in copybooks created using the intaglio printmaking method.

The term Copperplate Script identifies one of the most well-known and appreciated calligraphic styles of all time. Earlier versions of this script required a thin-tipped feather pen. Later, with the rise of industrialization, the use of more flexible and durable fine-point metal nibs became widespread. Many masters offered their contributions in defining the aesthetic canons of the copperplate script, but what really stood out as fundamental was the work of the writing master and engraver George Bickham, who in his book The Universal Penman (1733–1741) collected script samples from twenty-five of the most talented London calligraphers. Copperplate was undoubtedly the most widespread script in the period between the 17th and 18th centuries, and its influence spread not only throughout Europe but also in North America.

See also
 D'Nealian, a style of writing and teaching cursive and manuscript adapted from the Palmer Method
Engraving
 Palmer Method, a form of penmanship instruction developed in the late 19th century that replaced Spencerian script as the most popular handwriting system in the United States
 Round hand, a style of handwriting and calligraphy originating in England in the 1660s
 Zaner-Bloser, another streamlined form of Spencerian script
 Teaching script

Penmanship
Western calligraphy